Cope Branch is a stream in the U.S. state of Missouri. It is a tributary of the Little Black River.

Cope Branch has the name of Sandy Cope, an early settler.

See also
List of rivers of Missouri

References

Rivers of Butler County, Missouri
Rivers of Ripley County, Missouri
Rivers of Missouri